James Thomas Stopford, 4th Earl of Courtown (27 March 1794 – 20 November 1858), known as Viscount Stopford from 1810 to 1835, was an Anglo-Irish peer and Tory Member of Parliament.

Courtown was the third but eldest surviving son of James Stopford, 3rd Earl of Courtown, and his wife Lady Mary (née Scott), and was educated at Christ Church, Oxford. He was elected to the House of Commons for County Wexford in 1820, a seat he held until 1830. In 1835 he succeeded his father in the earldom and entered the House of Lords. He also served as High Sheriff of County Wexford in 1833 and as custos rotulorum of County Wexford from 1845 to 1858.

Lord Courtown married, firstly, his first cousin Lady Charlotte Albina, daughter of Charles Montagu-Scott, 4th Duke of Buccleuch, in 1822. They had two sons, James and Edward. After her death in February 1828, aged 28, he married, secondly, Dorothea (Dora), daughter of Edward Pennefather, Lord Chief Justice of Ireland and Susanna Darby. They had three sons, of whom the two youngest gained distinction. The Hon. Sir Frederick Stopford was a lieutenant general in the Army and the Hon. Walter George Stopford (1855–1918) was a Rear-Admiral in the Royal Navy. Lord Courtown died in November 1858, aged 64, and was succeeded in the earldom by his son from his first marriage, James. Lady Courtown survived her husband by just over a year and died in December 1859.

Notes

References
Kidd, Charles, Williamson, David (editors). Debrett's Peerage and Baronetage (1990 edition). New York: St Martin's Press, 1990,

External links

1794 births
1858 deaths
Members of the Parliament of the United Kingdom for County Wexford constituencies (1801–1922)
UK MPs 1820–1826
UK MPs 1826–1830
UK MPs who inherited peerages
High Sheriffs of Wexford
James
Earls of Courtown